Lady Demon is a fictional character that appears in comic books published by Chaos! Comics. Her first appearance was in Lady Death: Between Heaven and Hell #3. Lady Demon is Lady Death's much darker and evolved form.

Fictional character biography
When Lady Death, tired of endlessly fighting, embraced the darkness within, a demonic persona evolved and Lady Demon was born. This demonic incarnation cast Purgatori out to Earth and became Lucifer's consort. This did not last however, as Marion's spirit contacted Lady Demon and Lady Death came back to her senses. Absorbing her mother's angelic powers, Lady Demon returned to battle Lucifer, ultimately casting him through the gates of Heaven.

Lucifer is later revealed to possess the power of creation and Lady Demon, one of his creations, still exists, albeit with a soul. She seeks out Lady Death and unsuccessfully tries to reincorporate her soul. Featured in her own mini-series, Lady Demon escapes to Earth after she merges with a recently deceased mortal woman, co-ops agent Cheryl Montessori and pursues a murderous rampage.

An interim story of her time in Hell as Lucifer's consort and slave is featured in Chaos Quarterly #2

In 2010 Dynamite had brought all but Lady Death from the Chaos Comic library. This caused Lady Demon to be her own character. In 2014 Lady Demon had her first Dynamite comic series. In this series, Lady Demon is on the run from Lucifer's Hitmen. In another appearance in Red Sonja: Age of Chaos, she and Mistress Hel fight each other.

Comic appearances (in order of appearance)
Lady Death: Between Heaven and Hell #3
Chaos Quarterly #1 (page 14)
Chaos Quarterly #2
Lady Death: Between Heaven and Hell Issue #4
Lady Death Monthly #0-4
Lady Demon #1
Lady Demon #2
Lady Demon #3
Lady Death: The Rapture #1 (page 21)
 Lady Demon #1—4 (December 2014—April 2015)
 Red Sonja: Age of Chaos #1—6 (January—August 2020)

References 

Chaos! Comics titles
Horror comics